The 1907–08 season was Manchester City F.C.'s seventeenth season of league football and fifth consecutive season in the top flight of English football.

Team Kit

Football League First Division

Results summary

Reports

FA Cup

Squad statistics

Squad
Appearances for competitive matches only

Scorers

All

League

FA Cup

See also
Manchester City F.C. seasons

References

External links
Extensive Manchester City statistics site

1907-08
English football clubs 1907–08 season